Hedwig of Nordgau (c. 922 – after 993) was the wife of Siegfried of Luxembourg, first count of Luxembourg and founder of the country. They were married c. 950. She was of Saxon origin but her parentage is not known for certain. Some sources claim that she was connected to the family of Otto I, Holy Roman Emperor. Described as "saintly" herself, Hedwig of Nordgau was the mother of Saint Cunigunde of Luxembourg, the seventh of eleven children from her marriage to Siegfried.

Children
Hedwig of Nordgau's children included:
Henry, count of Luxemburg
Adalbert, archbishop of Trier
Luitgard, married Arnulf, Count of Holland
Eva, married count Gerard of Elzass
Cunigunde, married Henry II, Holy Roman Emperor
Dietrich, bishop of Metz
Frederik, father of the later counts Henry II and Giselbert

Notes and references

Sources
Butler, Alban; Thurston, Herbert; and Attwater, Donald (1956). Butler's Lives of the Saints, Volume 1, 2nd Edition. P. J. Kenedy and Sons.
Fuchs, Rüdiger (2006). Die Inschriften der Stadt Trier I (bis 1500). Reichert.  
Holböck, Ferdinand (2002). Married Saints and Blesseds: Through the Centuries. Ignatius Press, p. 134. 

920s births
Year of death uncertain
Countesses of Luxembourg
Conradines
People from the Duchy of Saxony
10th-century Saxon people
10th-century French people
10th-century French women